Shark Fin Glacier is a named in association with the nearby mountain Shark Fin.

Glaciers of Scott Coast